"Caballo Viejo" ('Old Horse') is a Venezuelan folk song written and composed by Simón Díaz, which appears on the 1980 album Golpe Y Pasaje. It has become one of the most important folk songs in Venezuela and is regarded as a classic. "Bamboléo", a potpourri by the Gipsy Kings, has some verses from Caballo Viejo, and it is also popular internationally.

Versions and translations
The song has been translated into many different languages.

It has been recorded as "Caballo Viejo" or as "Bamboleo" by dozens of singers, such as Celia Cruz, Papo Lucca y la Sonora Ponceña, María Dolores Pradera, Julio Iglesias, Gilberto Santa Rosa, José Luis Rodríguez "El Puma", Polo Montañes, Freddy López, Oscar D'León, Celso Piña, Gipsy Kings, Ray Coniff, Rubén Blades, Roberto Torres and Plácido Domingo. Roberto Torres's cover of the song was inducted into the Latin Grammy Hall of Fame in 2007.

It was covered in Serbian language under the title "Španska kraljica" (Spanish Queen) by Eurodance group Beat Street in 1995.

See also
Music of Venezuela (Musica Llanera)
Simón Díaz

References

External links
 Simón Díaz website
 Review in The Guardian
 Review in Diario el Pais
 Video of Caballo Viejo with English lyrics

1980 songs
1989 singles
Spanish-language songs
Venezuelan songs
Latin Grammy Hall of Fame Award recipients